Tove Irma Margit Ditlevsen (14 December 1917 – 7 March 1976) was a Danish poet and author. With published works in a variety of genres, she was one of Denmark's best-known authors by the time of her death.

Life 

Tove Ditlevsen was born in Copenhagen and grew up in the working-class neighbourhood of Vesterbro. Her childhood experiences were the focal points of her work. Ditlevsen was married (and divorced) four times.

In her life, Ditlevsen published 29 books including short stories, novels, poetry, and memoirs. Female identity, memory, and loss of childhood are recurring themes in her work. She began writing poems at the age of ten. Her first volume of poetry was published in her early twenties. In 1947, she experienced popular success with the publication of her poetry collection Blinkende Lygter (Flickering Lights). The Danish Broadcasting Corporation commissioned her to write a novel, Vi har kun hinanden (We only have each other), which was published in 1954 and broadcast as radio installments. Ditlevsen also authored a column in the weekly Familie Journalen, responding to letters from readers.

Three of her books, Barndom (Childhood), Ungdom (Youth), and Gift (meaning both poison and married), form an autobiographical trilogy. The first two books were translated by Tiina Nunnally and published in 1985 by Seal Press under the title Early Spring. The complete trilogy, with the third book translated by Michael Favala Goldman, was published in one volume in 2019 (with the titles Childhood, Youth and Dependency) and referred to as The Copenhagen Trilogy.

Throughout her adult life, Ditlevsen struggled with alcohol and drug abuse, and she was admitted to a psychiatric hospital several times, a recurring theme in her later novels. In 1976, she died by suicide from an overdose of sleeping pills.

Recognition and legacy 
Ditlevsen was awarded the Tagea Brandt Rejselegat in 1953 and De Gyldne Laurbær in 1956. In 2014, she was included in the literary canon for Danish primary schools.

Her poem "Blinkende Lygter", from the poetry collection of the same name, is referred to and namesake for the 2000 Danish film Flickering Lights, directed by Anders Thomas Jensen and often named the most popular feature film in its native Denmark in various polls. Her novel Barndommens gade was made into a film in mid-1980s and Anne Linnet released an album with poems by Ditlevsen, sung by Linnet. The music from the album was also used in the movie Barndommens gade.

Bibliography 
 Pigesind, poems 1939.
 Slangen i Paradiset, poems 1939.
 Man gjorde et barn fortræd, novel 1941.
 De evige tre, poems 1942.
 Lille Verden, poems 1942.
 Barndommens gade, novel, 1943.
 Den fulde Frihed, short stories 1944.
 Det første møde, short story, 1944.
 For Barnets Skyld, novel, 1946.
 Blinkende Lygter), poems, 1947.
 Dommeren, short stories, 1948.
 "Tårer", short story, 1948. 
 En flink dreng, short stories, 1952.
 Paraplyen, short stories, 1952.
 "Nattens dronning", short story, 1952.
 Vi har kun hinanden, 1954.
 Jalousi, poems, 1955.
 Der bor en pige, poem, 1955.
 Kvindesind, poems, 1955.
 Annelise - 13 år, children's book, 1958.
 Flugten fra opvasken, memoirs, 1959.
 Hvad nu Annelise?, children's book, 1960.
 To som elsker hinanden, novel, 1960.
 Den hemmelige rude, poems, 1961.
 Den onde lykke, short stories, 1963.
 Dolken, short stories, 1963.
 Barndom, memoirs, 1967.
 Ungdom, memoirs, 1967.
 Ansigterne, novel, 1968.
 De voksne, poems, 1969.
 Det tidlige forår, memoirs, 1969.
 Gift, erindringer, memoirs, 1971.
 Det runde værelse, poems, 1973.
 Parenteser, essays, 1973.
 Min nekrolog og andre skumle tanker, essays, 1973.
 Min første kærlighed, memoirs, 1973.
 Vilhelms værelse, novel, 1975.
 Tove Ditlevsen om sig selv, memoirs, 1975.
 Til en lille pige, poems, 1978.
 Kærlig hilsen, Tove - Breve til en forlægger, letters (1969-1975), 2019.

Awards, prizes and grants 
1942 - Carl Møllers Legat
1942 - Emma Bærentzens Legat
1942 - Astrid Goldschmidts Legat
1945 - Forfatterforbundets Legat
1945 - Holger Drachmann-legatet
1950 - Edith Rode Legatet
1952 - Direktør J.P. Lund og hustru Vilhelmine Bugge's Legat
1953 - Otto Benzons Forfatterlegat
1953 - Tagea Brandt Rejselegat
1954 - Emil Aarestrup Medaillen
1955 - Tipsmidler
1956 - De Gyldne Laurbær
1958 - Jeanne og Henri Nathansens Mindelegat
1958 - Morten Nielsens Mindelegat
1959 - Forlaget Fremads folkebiblioteks legat
1959 - Ministry of Culture's children book prize (Denmark) (Kulturministeriets Børnebogspris) for her Children's book Annelise - tretten år
1966 - Rektor frk. Ingrid Jespersens Legat
1971 - Biblioteksafgiftens top 25: 10 (She was number 10 on the top-25 list over library books
1971 - Søren Gyldendal Prize
1975 - Dansk Forfatterforenings H.C. Andersen Legat
1975 - Jeanne og Henri Nathansens Mindelegat
1999 – 23 years after her death, the readers of Politiken could choose a book as "Danish book of the Century". Ditlevsen's book Barndommens gade was number 21.

References

Further reading

1917 births
1976 deaths
1976 suicides
Danish women poets
Danish women novelists
Danish children's writers
Danish women short story writers
People from Copenhagen
Danish women children's writers
20th-century Danish women writers
20th-century Danish novelists
20th-century Danish poets
20th-century Danish short story writers
Danish memoirists
Drug-related suicides in Denmark
Burials at Vestre Cemetery, Copenhagen